Johan Hansen may refer to:
 Jóhan Hansen, Faroese-born Danish handballer
 Johan Hansen (1838–1913), Danish businessman and art collector
 Johan Kjær Hansen, member of the Danish resistance 
 Johan Hansen (sport shooter)

See also
 Johan Irgens-Hansen, Norwegian literary critic, theatre critic and theatre director